Zhuolan Township is an urban township in Miaoli County, Taiwan.

History
Formerly called Talan.

Geography
In January 2023, Zhuolan's population was estimated at 15,505. 

Administrative divisions

The township comprises 11 villages: Fengtian, Jingshan, Laozhuang, Miaofeng, Neiwan, Pinglin, Shangxin, Xincuo, Xinrong, Xiping and Zhongjie.

Politics
The township is part of Miaoli County Constituency II electoral district for Legislative Yuan.

Economy

Agricultural products
Pears, grapes, starfruits and tangerines are the four main kinds of fruits grown in Zhuolan.

Tourist attractions
 Lixiping Leisure Agriculture Area

Transportation

Bus station

Bus station in the township is Zhuolan Bus Station of Fengyuan Bus. Taichung City Bus routes link Zhuolan with Fengyuan and Dongshi districts of Taichung City. Another bus route is to Dahu Township operate by Hsintsu Bus.

Highway
Provincial Highway 3 passes by Zhuolan, linking it with Dahu, Miaoli County to the north and Dongshi District, Taichung to the south.

References

External links 

  

Townships in Miaoli County
Taiwan placenames originating from Formosan languages